Caustis gigas, commonly known as giant twig-rush, is a sedge that is native to Western Australia.

The plant blooms between April and May producing brown flowers.

It is found in the Wheatbelt region between Chittering and Coorow where it grows in sandy soils.

References

Plants described in 2015
Flora of Western Australia
gigas
Taxa named by Russell Lindsay Barrett